IBC was an Australian bus chassis manufacturer based in Brisbane.

History
IBC was founded in the 1963 by Ian & Bruce Campbell and manufactured bus and coach chassis powered by Caterpillar or General Motors engines. In 1980 it had a chassis bodied by Pressed Metal Corporation to the same style as being delivered to the Urban Transit Authority as a demonstrator. It ceased trading in October 1991.

Further reading
Queensland Omnibus & Coach Society Issues 44 - 48 2001

References

Bus manufacturers of Australia
Manufacturing companies based in Brisbane
Australian companies established in 1963
Australian companies disestablished in 1991